Chae Bo-hun (b. 23 August, 1992) is a South Korean singer-songwriter, also known as The VANE. He is the vocalist of rock band Purple Rain, which finished third at JTBC's televised talent show Superband. He regularly contributes to Korean drama soundtracks, as well.

Life and career 
Chae Bo-hun was born in Daegu, has one older brother. In 2012, he placed first at the Busan MBC University Song Festival with his composition All in Love, and placed second with a composition called Neoreul cheoum bon sungan nan banhaesseo (너를 처음 본 순간 난 반했어). In 2015, he created a one-man band called The VANE. In 2016 and 2017 he participated in the MBC program Duet Song Festival, where he performed together with the lead singer of Jaurim, Kim Yoon-ah. They won five times. In 2019, he participated in JTBC's talent show, Superband, where he was placed third as part of a group named Purple Rain. The band signed with JTBC Studio after the show and released their own music.

He has recorded songs for several South Korean television dramas, including Save Me, Two Cops, Vagabond, Hell Is Other People and Itaewon Class.

Discography

The VANE 
Singles
 2015: Beck
 2015: Moon Like The Star
 2017: Alone
 2017: Grow
 2018: Mask

EPs
 2016: Line
 2019: Run

Studio albums
 2017: Round

Soundtracks 
 2017: "Hwangak" (환각) (Save Me OST)
 2017: "Dreamer" (Two Cops OST)
 2018: "Changer" (Player OST) 
 2019: "Teoneol" (터널) (Item OST) 
 2019: "Nightmare" (Love in Sadness OST) 
 2019: "Savior" (Save Me 2 OST) 
 2019: "Room No. 303" (Hell Is Other People OST) 
 2019: "Open Fire" (Vagabond OST)
 2019: "Bird" (My Country: The New Age OST, with Purple Rain) 
 2020: "No Break" (직진) (Itaewon Class OST)
 2020: "Superhero" (Sweet Munchies OST)
 2022: "You've Got Me Wrong" (Insider'' OST)

References

External links 
 The VAIN discography 

1992 births
People from Daegu
South Korean singer-songwriters
Living people
South Korean rock singers